Kirk John Pearson (born September 22, 1958) is an American politician. He was a member of the Washington State Senate from 2013 to 2017 and before that served as a member of the Washington House of Representatives from 2001 to 2013, in both positions as a member of the Republican Party representing the 39th district. It includes most of Snohomish and Skagit counties, as well as some of northern King County.

He previously served as Planning Commissioner for the City of Monroe from 1989 to 1992; and special assistant to U.S. representative Jack Metcalf. He is a past member of the Correctional Industries Board, the Pacific Fisheries Legislative Task Force, and Sentencing Guidelines Commission.

Pearson was raised in Monroe, Washington, where he graduated from Monroe High School in 1977. He attended Wenatchee Valley College and Central Washington University. He resigned as state senator in 2017 to become the state director of the United States Department of Agriculture's Office of Rural Development.

References

1958 births
Living people
Republican Party members of the Washington House of Representatives
Republican Party Washington (state) state senators
21st-century American politicians
People from Monroe, Washington